Mieszko Talarczyk (December 23, 1974 – December 26, 2004) was the lead singer and guitarist of the Swedish grindcore band Nasum, Genocide Superstars, Krigshot and Charles Harfager. Known for his engineering and production abilities, he co-founded Soundlab studios with Millencolin guitarist Mathias Färm.

In 2004, Mieszko went on holiday to Thailand with his girlfriend during a break in between albums, and died in the tsunami disaster on December 26, 2004. His body was identified on February 16, 2005 and his remains were transported back to his hometown of Örebro, Sweden where his funeral was held on 30 March. Though badly injured, his girlfriend Emma survived. After Mieszko's death, Nasum and Genocide Superstars disbanded permanently.

References 
 

1974 births
2004 deaths
Deaths by drowning
Victims of the 2004 Indian Ocean earthquake and tsunami
Natural disaster deaths in Thailand
Polish emigrants to Sweden
Swedish heavy metal guitarists
Swedish heavy metal singers
20th-century Swedish male singers
20th-century guitarists